Michael I, (? – August 1420) was Voivode of Wallachia from 1415 to 1420. He was the only legitimate son of Mircea I of Wallachia, who made him his co-ruler. Styled as prince from 1415, Michael became sole ruler after his father died in early 1418. His support for a Hungarian campaign against the Ottoman Empire caused the Ottoman Sultan, Mehmed I, to invade Wallachia, forcing him to agree to pay tribute. After Michael failed to respect the treaty, the Ottomans gave assistance to his rival, Dan, who crossed into Wallachia in 1420. Dan and his Ottoman allies defeated the Wallachian army, and Michael was killed on the battlefield.

Early life 
The son of Mircea I of Wallachia and his wife, Maria Tolmay, Michael was Mircea's only legitimate son. Alexander Aldea and Vlad were Michael's most prominent illegitimate half-brothers, who, in accordance with local custom, could have claimed the throne of Wallachia. To strengthen Michael's position, his father made him his co-ruler.

Reign 
Although Michael was first mentioned as Mircea's co-ruler in 1391, it was only from 1415 that he was consistently styled as "voivode and prince". Michael was still his father's co-ruler when in 1417 he refused to send the tribute that Mircea had promised to pay to the Ottoman Empire. Michael became the sole ruler of Wallachia after his father died on 31January 1418.

The first year of his reign was peaceful because the Ottoman Sultan, Mehmed I, was still occupied with the internal consolidation of the Ottoman Empire. Michael supported Sigismund of Luxembourg, King of Hungary, who launched a campaign against the Ottoman Empire in the autumn of 1419. They captured the city of Turnu Severin that Michael's father had lost to the Ottomans, but it was put under Sigismund's control. In retaliation, the sultan broke into Wallachia, forcing Michael to cede Giurgiu and other fortresses on the Danube to the Ottomans and to pay the tribute he had failed to send during the previous three years. Michael was also forced to send his two sons, Michael and Radu, as hostages to the Ottoman Empire.

Michael's cousin, Dan, then laid claim to Wallachia. Many of Michael's boyars (including the influential Albul and Utmeș) defected to the pretender. Dan crossed into Wallachia in early 1420. Initially, Michael was able to resist, but since he had failed to implement all provisions of his 1419 treaty with the Ottoman Empire, his cousin was able to obtain military assistance from the Ottomans. Michael received support from Hungary, but their united forces were routed in the summer of 1420. Michael was killed on the battlefield.

Ancestry

References

Sources 

 
 
 
 
 

|-

1420 deaths
Rulers of Wallachia
House of Basarab
Monarchs killed in action
Year of birth unknown